Live in Detroit, MI is a live album (2-CD set) by the band King Crimson, released by the Discipline Global Mobile through the King Crimson Collectors' Club in October 2001. Recorded in Detroit, Michigan at the Eastown Theatre on 13 November 1971. The packaging erroneously credits the CD as being from 13 December 1971.

Track listing

Disc 1
"Pictures of a City" (Robert Fripp, Peter Sinfield) 9:02
including:
"42nd at Treadmill"
"Formentera Lady" (Fripp, Sinfield) 9:08
"Sailor's Tale" (Fripp) 5:59
"Cirkus" (Fripp, Sinfield) 9:14
including:
"Entry of the Chameleons"
"Ladies of the Road" (Fripp, Sinfield) 7:54
"Groon (Part I)" (Fripp) 17:49

Disc 2
"21st Century Schizoid Man" (Fripp, Michael Giles, Greg Lake, Ian McDonald, Sinfield) 13:21
including:
"Mirrors" 
"Mars: The Bringer of War" (Gustav Holst, arr. by Boz Burrell, Mel Collins, Fripp, Ian Wallace) 13:22
"The Court of the Crimson King" (McDonald, Sinfield) 3:31
"Lady of the Dancing Water" (Fripp, Sinfield) 2:25

Personnel
Robert Fripp - guitar, mellotron
Boz Burrell - bass guitar, lead vocals
Mel Collins - saxophone, flute, mellotron
Ian Wallace - drums, vocals, sleeve notes
Peter Sinfield - lyrics, sounds & visions
Robert Ellis - photography  
Hugh O'Donnell - design
Alex R Mundy - producer, digital editing

Notes
The audience link after "Pictures of a City" has been repaired. A few obvious faults remain. The introduction to "Ladies of the Road" is missing, and there is a break in the middle of "Groon", where the original tapes were changed. "Lady Of The Dancing Water" remains an incomplete fragment.

References

2001 live albums
King Crimson Collector's Club albums